Byhalia Creek is a stream in the U.S. state of Mississippi. It is a tributary to the Coldwater River.

Byhalia Creek is a name derived from the Choctaw language or Chickasaw language, purported to be a reference to white oaks. The name sometimes is spelled "Bihalia Creek".

References

Rivers of Mississippi
Rivers of DeSoto County, Mississippi
Rivers of Marshall County, Mississippi
Mississippi placenames of Native American origin